Rafael Anglés Herrero (Teruel, 1730 - Valencia, 1816) was a Spanish organist and composer.

He studied humanities and music in Alcañiz, in whose then collegiate church he held the position of chapel master until 1762, the year in which he obtained the position of organist in the cathedral of Valencia for fifty-four years, a position in which he succeeded Vicente Rodríguez. 

His organ work is kept in the archives of the Cathedral of Orihuela, the Cathedral of Valladolid, and the Cathedral of Valencia. The Library of Catalonia and the French Institute of Madrid also house his scores. This keyboard music, which was also played on the harpsichord, is made up of Scarlattian sonatas, steps or fugues and psalms.

Selected works
adagietto
sonata en fa
aria en re menor 
fugatto
2 sonatas
5 pasos para órgano
Salmodia para órgano
20 sonatas

References
Palacios, José Ignacio: Los compositores aragoneses, Zaragoza, CAI, 2000, pág. 66. ISBN 84-95306-41-7
http://www.enciclopedia-aragonesa.com/voz.asp?voz_id=882&tipo_busqueda=1&nombre=Angl%E9s,%20Rafael Gran Enciclopedia Aragonesa 

Spanish Classical-period composers
1730 births
1816 deaths
People from Teruel